The last spike is the final rail spike driven in the construction of a railway. It is often a momentous occasion and special ceremonial spikes of gold or silver may be used.

Last spike may refer to:
Last Spike (Canadian Pacific Railway), driven in 1885
The Last Spike (book), a 1971 book by historian Pierre Berton, the second volume of an account of the Canadian Pacific Railway's origins and construction
Towards the Last Spike, a 1952 poem by Canadian poet E. J. Pratt about the Canadian Pacific Railway construction
Last Spike (Grand Trunk Pacific Railway), Canada, driven in 1914
Last Spike (Nevada), the last spike of the San Pedro, Los Angeles and Salt Lake Railroad, driven in 1905
Last Spike Memorial, a monument on the location of the North Island Main Trunk line in New Zealand, driven in 1908
Golden spike, the final spike of the first transcontinental railroad across the United States, driven in 1869